Barbier is a lunar impact crater that is located on the southern hemisphere on the far side of the Moon. It forms a matched pair with Cyrano to the north-northwest, and it lies to the southeast of the huge walled plain Gagarin. Southwest of Barbier is the crater Sierpinski, and to the southeast is the Mare Ingenii.

The outer rim of Barbier has been eroded somewhat by subsequent impacts, particularly at the north end where the wall has been degraded by several small craterlets. A small crater lies across the eastern rim, and the southern rim is wider and irregular in shape. An unusual irregular crater (Barbier F) with a hummocky floor, approximately 16 km long, lies near where a central peak would be located, offset to the east of the midpoint.

Satellite craters
By convention these features are identified on lunar maps by placing the letter on the side of the crater midpoint that is closest to Barbier.

See also
 Asteroid 37853 Danielbarbier

References

External links

 Figure 238 in Chapter 7 of APOLLO OVER THE MOON: A View From Orbit (NASA SP-362, 1978) shows a closeup of the unusual crater near the center of Barbier crater

Impact craters on the Moon